Albert Clyde McDonald (September 15, 1930 – July 6, 2014) was an American politician and member of the Democratic Party.

Born in Dayton, Tennessee, McDonald graduated from Auburn University. McDonald raised soy beans and cotton on his farm in the Huntsville, Alabama area. McDonald served in the Alabama State Senate from 1974 to 1982. He was then elected Alabama Commissioner of Agriculture and Industries serving from 1983 to 1991. His daughter is Caroline McDonald.  She is married to Republican Robert Aderholt who serves in the United States House of Representatives representing the 4th District of Alabama.

Notes

External links

1930 births
2014 deaths
Politicians from Huntsville, Alabama
People from Dayton, Tennessee
Auburn University alumni
Farmers from Alabama
Alabama Commissioners of Agriculture and Industries
Democratic Party Alabama state senators